Robert Burgess (born December 21, 1952) is a retired amateur boxer from Bermuda. He competed at the 1976 Summer Olympics, but was eliminated in the third bout by Costică Dafinoiu.

References

1952 births
Living people
Boxers at the 1976 Summer Olympics
Olympic boxers of Bermuda
Bermudian male boxers
Light-heavyweight boxers